Exercise Juniper Cobra is a five-day combined military exercise between Israel and the United States. The exercise exists to strengthen American-Israeli military cooperation against regional threats, and promote long-term security. In recent years, it has had the additional effect of providing training in the case of a ballistic missile attack from Iran. The exercise was initiated in 2001 and is conducted once every two years. The most recent exercise was held in March 2018, showing a focus on defense against a potential Iran attack.

See also
2012 US-Israel military exercise
Arrow (Israeli missile)
Israel–United States military relations

References

Military exercises involving the United States
Military exercises involving Israel